The 2010 UEFA Women's Under-19 Championship First qualifying round was the first round of qualifications for the Final Tournament of 2010 UEFA Women's Under-19 Championship. 44 teams are split into 11 groups of 4 and teams in each group play each other once. The top two teams in each group and the best third-placed team will enter the 2010 UEFA Women's U-19 Championship Second qualifying round.

Summary

Teams that have secured a place in the  2010 UEFA Women's U-19 Championship Second qualifying round were.

Serbia was best third-place finisher, being the only third placed team to draw one of its games against the top two in their group.

Group 1
 Host country: Croatia

Group 2
 Host country: Estonia

Group 3
 Host country: Denmark

Group 4
 Host country: Bulgaria

Group 5
 Host country: Netherlands

Group 6
 Host country: England

Group 7
 Host country: Turkey

Group 8
 Host country: Hungary

Group 9
 Host country: Austria

Group 10
 Host country: Azerbaijan

(f: Match forfeited)

Group 11
 Host country: Portugal

References

Q1
2010,1
2009 in women's association football
2010 in youth sport